Bangur Institute of Neurosciences, also known as the  Bangur Institute of Neurology and abbreviated BIN, is a government-run apex superspeciality institute/hospital located at 52/1A, Sambhu Nath Pandit Street, Bhawanipur, Kolkata, West Bengal. The institute is adjacent to and functionally attached to IPGMER and SSKM Hospital. The institute is affiliated to the West Bengal University of Health Science.

This is a government-sponsored neurological institute and a training centre in the field of neuroscience in West Bengal. Patients are regularly referred here from various hospitals in West Bengal and adjoining states. This hospital's research activities include studies into strokes, cognitive neuroscience, movement disorders, epilepsy, neuromuscular conditions (myasthenia), developmental disorders of the brain, Wilson's disease, electrophysiology, botulinium toxin, and neurogenetics.

Controversies 

Due to an inadequacy in the number of beds, patients have complained that even critical patients are often refused admission.

On 26 May 2011, Shyamapada Ghorai, then director of BIN was suspended with charges of misconduct, insubordination and non-co-operation. This was one of the first administrative actions taken by Chief Minister of West Bengal, Mamata Banerjee.
Even after the surprise visit of the Chief Minister, the situation did not improve. According to a report published in The Telegraph (Calcutta) in June 2012, "A year and a fortnight after chief minister Mamata Banerjee suspended Shyamapada Ghorai from the post of Bangur Institute of Neuroscience (BIN) director – one of her first administrative actions since assuming office."

References 
 Citations

 Notes

Hospitals in Kolkata
Affiliates of West Bengal University of Health Sciences
Educational institutions in India with year of establishment missing